The five teams in this group played against each other on a home-and-away basis. The group winner Italy qualified for the 17th FIFA World Cup held in South Korea and Japan. The runner-up Romania advanced to the UEFA Play-off and played against Slovenia. Italy conceded two unexpected draws against the lowest-ranked sides in the group, but won the big matches comfortably, and were established as group winners long before the end of the campaign. Romania lost both games against Italy but had five wins out of six in the other matches, and second place was likewise ensured early.

Standings

Results

Goalscorers

7 goals

 Filippo Inzaghi

5 goals

 Alessandro Del Piero

4 goals

 Aleksandr Iashvili

3 goals

 Miklós Fehér
 Ferenc Horváth
 Marius Niculae

2 goals

 Temuri Ketsbaia
 Attila Korsós
 János Mátyus
 Vilmos Sebők
 Marco Delvecchio
 Francesco Totti
 Adrian Ilie

1 goal

 Archil Arveladze
 Shota Arveladze
 Giorgi Gakhokidze
 Gocha Jamarauli
 Georgi Kinkladze
 Levan Kobiashvili
 Béla Illés
 Krisztián Lisztes
 Orestas Buitkus
 Artūras Fomenka
 Tomas Ražanauskas
 Cosmin Contra
 Ioan Ganea
 Viorel Moldovan
 Cătălin Munteanu
 Gheorghe Popescu

External links
FIFA official page
RSSSF - 2002 World Cup Qualification
Allworldcup

8
2000–01 in Italian football
Qual
2000 in Lithuanian football
2001 in Lithuanian football
2000–01 in Hungarian football
2001–02 in Hungarian football
2000–01 in Romanian football
2001–02 in Romanian football
2001–02 in Georgian football
2000–01 in Georgian football